Coronado High School is the name of several high schools in the United States of America, including:

 Coronado High School (Arizona), located in Scottsdale, Arizona
 Coronado High School (California), located in Coronado, California
 Coronado High School (Colorado), located in Colorado Springs, Colorado
 Coronado High School (Nevada), located in Henderson, Nevada
 Coronado High School (El Paso, Texas), located in El Paso, Texas
 Coronado High School (Lubbock, Texas), located in Lubbock, Texas